The Lawrance L-3 and L-4 were early aircraft piston engines with three radial cylinders, designed and built by the Lawrance Aero Engine Company in the early 1920s. The L-3 / L-4 series were marketed by the Wright Aeronautical Corporation as the Wright Gale after the acquisition of the Lawrance company.

Applications
 Loening M-2
 Naval Aircraft Factory SA
 Sikorsky S-33 Messenger

Specifications

See also

References

 This article contains material that originally came from the placard at the Steven F. Udvar-Hazy Center, with dimensional error corrected (radius reported as diameter).

External links

 

1910s aircraft piston engines
L-3